Goody is a platform game developed by Gonzalo Suárez Girard and released in 1987 by the Spanish company Opera Soft. The game was released for Amstrad CPC, MSX, ZX Spectrum, and MS-DOS compatible operating systems.

Goody was the first video game by the Spanish designer Gonzalo Suárez Girard, who went on to make Commandos: Behind Enemy Lines.

Plot

As an experienced thief John Nelson Brainner Stravinsky, known as Goody, has a mission to break into the Bank of Spain. Equipped with a ladder Goody explores catacombs and city buildings. Along the way he may collect treasure needed to purchase tools such as dynamite or a drill and to find out the access code to the main vault. There are many objects and enemies, such as remote-control combat helicopters, vipers, gorillas, the policeman Rodríguez, ghosts and the evil Moon who try to stop Goody.

Legacy
Goody The Remake was released by Coptron Game Studios in 2007 for Microsoft Windows and Linux.

There is a Goody version for mobile phones published by eBrain Mobile in 2007, called Goody Returns. It uses 2.5D graphics.

References

External links

Goody at Spectrum Computing

1987 video games
Amstrad CPC games
DOS games
ZX Spectrum games
Single-player video games
MSX games
Linux games
Mobile games
Platform games
Video games about crime
Video games developed in Spain
Windows games